Kahir-e Borz may refer to:
 Kahir-e Borz-e Bala
 Kahir-e Borz-e Pain